George Edward Tobin (July 9, 1921 – January 2, 1999) was an American football guard who played one season with the New York Giants of the National Football League (NFL). He played college football at the University of Notre Dame and attended Marianapolis Preparatory School in Thompson, Connecticut.

College career
Tobin played for the Notre Dame Fighting Irish,  lettering for the team in 1942 and 1946. He served in the United States military during World War II from 1943 to 1945.

Professional career
In 1947, Tobin's head coach at Notre Dame Frank Leahy advised him to leave the school and accept a $5,000 offer to play for the NFL's New York Giants. Leahy thought that Tobin would be a starter with the Giants but would not see as much playing time on the talented Fighting Irish. Tobin played in eleven games for the Giants during the 1947 season.

References

External links
Just Sports Stats

1921 births
1999 deaths
Players of American football from Pennsylvania
American football guards
Notre Dame Fighting Irish football players
New York Giants players
American military personnel of World War II
People from Cambria County, Pennsylvania